Qasim Mahmoud , known as Qasim Zwea (4 July 1942 – 2 July 2014) was a former Iraqi football forward who played for Iraq between 1957 and 1968. He played in the 1964 Arab Nations Cup and 1966 Arab Nations Cup.

He died of cancer on 2 July 2014.

Career statistics

International goals
Scores and results list Iraq's goal tally first.

References

Iraqi footballers
Iraq international footballers
Living people
Association football forwards
1939 births
2014 deaths